The 2015 Sundance Film Festival took place from January 22 to February 1, 2015. What Happened, Miss Simone?, a biographical documentary film about American singer Nina Simone, opened the festival. Comedy-drama film Grandma, directed by Paul Weitz, served as the closing night film.

Awards
The awards ceremony was held on January 30, 2015 at  the Basin Recreation Fieldhouse in Park City, Utah. The ceremony was hosted by comedian Tig Notaro.
 U.S. Grand Jury Prize: Documentary – The Wolfpack
 U.S. Grand Jury Prize: Dramatic – Me and Earl and the Dying Girl
 World Cinema Grand Jury Prize: Documentary – The Russian Woodpecker
 World Cinema Grand Jury Prize: Dramatic – Slow West
 Audience Award: U.S. Documentary – Meru
 Audience Award: U.S. Dramatic – Me and Earl and the Dying Girl
 Audience Award: World Cinema Documentary – Dark Horse: The Incredible True Story of Dream Alliance 
 Audience Award: World Cinema Dramatic – Umrika
 Audience Award: Best of NEXT – James White
 Directing Award: U.S. Documentary – Cartel Land
 Directing Award: U.S. Dramatic – The Witch
 Directing Award: World Cinema Documentary – Dreamcatcher
 Directing Award: World Cinema Dramatic – The Summer of Sangaile
 Waldo Salt Screenwriting Award: U.S. Dramatic – The Stanford Prison Experiment
 Editing Award: World Cinema Documentary – How to Change the World
 Editing Award: U.S. Dramatic – Dope
 Cinematography Award: U.S. Documentary – Cartel Land
 Cinematography Award: U.S. Dramatic – The Diary of a Teenage Girl
 Cinematography Award: World Cinema Dramatic – Partisan
 World Cinema Dramatic Special Jury Award for Acting – Jack Reynor for Glassland and Regina Casé and Camila Márdila for The Second Mother
 World Cinema Documentary Special Jury Award for Impact – Pervert Park
 World Cinema Documentary Special Jury Award for Unparalleled Access – The Chinese Mayor
 U.S. Documentary Special Jury Award for Social Impact – 3½ Minutes
 U.S. Documentary Special Jury Award for Vérité Filmmaking – Western
 U.S. Dramatic Special Jury Award for Collaborative Vision – Advantageous
 Special Jury Award for Breakout First Feature – (T)ERROR
 Alfred P. Sloan Feature Film Prize – The Stanford Prison Experiment

Additional awards were presented at separate ceremonies. The Shorts Awards were presented January 28, 2015 at the ceremony in Park City, Utah.

 Short Film Grand Jury Prize – World of Tomorrow
 Short Film Jury Award: U.S. Fiction – SMILF
 Short Film Jury Award: International Fiction – Oh Lucy!
 Short Film Jury Award: Non-fiction – The Face of Ukraine: Casting Oksana Baiul
 Short Film Jury Award: Animation – Storm hits jacket
 Short Film Special Jury Award for Acting – Back Alley
 Short Film Special Jury Award for Visual Poetry – Object
 Sundance Institute/Mahindra Global Filmmaking Awards –  Haifaa al-Mansour for Be Safe I Love You, K'naan for The Poet, Myroslav Slaboshpytskiy  for Luxembourg, Oskar Sulowski for Rosebuds.
 Sundance Institute/NHK Filmmaker Award – Laure de Clermont-Tonnerre for Mustang.
 2015 Red Crown Producer’s Award – Stephanie Langhoff for The Bronze.

Juries
Jury members, for each program of the festival, including the Alfred P. Sloan Jury, which also took part in the Science in Film Forum Panel, were announced on December 18, 2014. Presenters of awards are followed by asterisks:

U.S. Documentary Jury
Eugene Hernandez*
Kirsten Johnson*
Michele Norris*
Gordon Quinn*
Roger Ross Williams*

U.S. Dramatic Jury
Lance Acord*
Sarah Flack*
Cary Fukunaga*
Winona Ryder*
Edgar Wright*

World Documentary Jury
Elena Fortes Acosta*
Mark Cousins*
Ingrid Kopp*

World Dramatic Jury
Mia Hansen-Løve*
Col Needham*
Taika Waititi*

Alfred P. Sloan Jury
Paula S. Apsell
Janna Levin
Brit Marling
Jonathan Nolan
Adam Steltzner

Short Film Jury
K. K. Barrett
Alia Shawkat
Autumn de Wilde

Others who presented awards included Adam Scott, Kevin Pollak, Kevin Corrigan, Patrick Fugit and Trevor Groth.

Films
For a full list of films appeared at the festival, see List of films at the 2015 Sundance Film Festival.

Festival theaters
The number of seats available at the festival theaters, where films were shown is listed below:

Park City
Eccles Theatre – 1,270 seats
Egyptian Theatre – 282 seats
Holiday Village Cinema 4 – 162 seats
Library Center Theatre – 486 seats
The MARC Theatre – 550 seats
Prospector Square Theatre – 324 seats
Redstone Cinema 1 – 188 seats
Redstone Cinema 2 – 175 seats
Redstone Cinema 7 – 176 seats
Temple Theatre – 840 seats
Yarrow Hotel Theatre – 295 seats

Salt Lake City
Broadway Cinema 3 – 243 seats
Broadway Cinema 6 – 245 seats
Rose Wagner Performing Arts Center – 495 seats
SLC Library – 300 seats
Tower Theatre – 349 seats
The Grand Theatre – 1,100 seats

Sundance Resort
Sundance Resort Screening Room – 164 seats

Ogden
Peery's Egyptian Theatre – 840 seats

Acquisitions
Acquisitions at the festival included the following:

A24 
The End of the Tour 
The Witch 
Mississippi Grind
Alchemy 
Strangerland 
Zipper
Bleecker Street
I'll See You In My Dreams
Broad Green 
A Walk in the Woods
Discover Channel 
Racing Extinction
Film Arcade 
Unexpected
Focus
Cop Car
Fortissimo
Songs My Brothers Taught Me
Fox Searchlight 
Mistress America 
Me, Earl And The Dying Girl 
Brooklyn
Gravitas Ventures 
Being Evel
HBO 
3 1/2 Minutes
IFC Films 
The D Train 
Sleeping with Other People
IFC Midnight 
Reversal 
The Hallow
Kino Lorber 
The Forbidden Room
Lionsgate 
Don Verdean 
Knock Knock
Magnolia
Results 
Tangerine 
Best of Enemies 
The Wolfpack
Netflix
Hot Girls Wanted
Open Road 
Dope
Orchard 
The Overnight 
Digging for Fire 
Finders Keepers 
Cartel Land
Oscilloscope
The Second Mother
Relativity Sports 
In Football We Trust
Samuel Goldwyn Films
Fresh Dressed
Lila & Eve
Screen Media Films 
Ten Thousand Saints
Showtime 
Dreamcatcher
Sony Pictures Classics 
The Diary of a Teenage Girl 
Grandma
Dark Horse
Sundance Selects 
City of Gold
Tribeca Film 
Misery Loves Comedy
Relativity 
The Bronze

References

External links

2015 film festivals
2015 in Utah
2015
2015 in American cinema
2015 festivals in the United States
January 2015 events in the United States